Cladonia graeca is a species of saxicolous (rock-dwelling), fruticose lichen in the family Cladoniaceae. Found in Greece, it was formally described as a new species in 2011 by lichenologists  Harrie Sipman and Teuvo Ahti. The small and inconspicuous lichen grows on boulders and cliffs of siliceous schist, especially in areas where downward-trickling water collects in dwarf shrub vegetation. It is similar to C. macrophylla and C. decorticata, but differs chemically from those species, as it contains fumarprotocetraric acid rather than  psoromic acid or perlatolic acid.

See also
List of Cladonia species

References

graeca
Lichen species
Lichens described in 2011
Lichens of Greece
Taxa named by Teuvo Ahti
Taxa named by Harrie Sipman